TI Group plc (formerly "Tube Investments") was a holding company for specialised engineering companies. It was based in Abingdon, Oxfordshire. It was registered as Tube Investments in 1919, combining the seamless steel tube businesses of Tubes Ltd, New Credenda Tube (later known as Creda), Simplex and Accles & Pollock. Reynolds Tube joined the group in 1928.

Tube Investments was listed on the London Stock Exchange, and was a constituent of the FTSE 100 Index. It was acquired by Smiths Industries in the end of 2000.

History
The company was registered as Tube Investments in 1919, combining the seamless steel tube businesses of Tubes Ltd, New Credenda Tube (later known as Creda), Simplex and Accles & Pollock. Reynolds Tube joined the group in 1928.

Ivan Stedeford joined the company in 1928. He became chief executive in 1935, and chairman in 1944. In 1946, the company bought Swallow Coachbuilding Co. (1935) Ltd. and Hercules Cycles. In 1949, the company established TI Cycles of India as a joint venture with the Murugappa family. The British Cycle Corporation subsidiary was formed in 1956, and consisted of Armstrong, Norman Cycles, Sun Cycles, Phillips Cycles and Hercules Cycles (no connection with the German Hercules company).

TI subsidiary Swallow Coachbuilding Co. constructed the Swallow Doretti sports car in 1954 and 1955. The 'Aluminium War' from 1958 to 1959 was a fierce and successful battle to acquire British Aluminium.

Raleigh Industries were acquired in 1960, bringing the Raleigh owned brands BSA Cycles, Humber, Triumph, Rudge, New Hudson, Sunbeam Three Spires and J. B. Brooks. The company bought kettle manufacturers Russell Hobbs in 1963, and Sir Ivan Stedeford retired as chairman and chief executive officer and became life president.

The group bought Alfred Herbert Ltd in 1982. In 1986, Tube Investments acquired Houdaille, parent of John Crane and other industrial companies from Kohlberg Kravis Roberts; the non Crane divisions were sold back to KKR as IDEX. Tube Investments acquired Armco Inc.'s European Tubing business – Fulton (UK) and Bundy Corporation (USA) in 1987; Raleigh was sold that year to Derby International and Creda to GEC.

TI Group bought Huron Products Industries (USA) in 1991, and Dowty Group in 1992, and sold Accles & Pollock to Hay Hall Group in 1996. Over the next few years, the Group acquired Technoflow Tube Systems (Germany), Bundy Asia Pacific, S&H Fabricating and Engineering (USA), Kenmore Italiana (Italy), Walbro Corporation (USA), and Marwal (France).

On 4 December 2000, Smiths Industries merged with TI Group. Smiths (thereafter renamed Smiths Group) divested TI Automotive shortly after the merger was completed.

Operations
The three major divisions were:

John Crane International, manufacturer of mechanical seals,
Bundy Corporation, a tubing manufacturer and supplier to the refrigeration and automotive industries, and
Dowty Group, an aerospace company.

The group also owned TI Creda, a manufacturer of domestic cookers, and owned TI Chesterfield Cylinders, a manufacturer of pressurised gas cylinders for companies such as BOC and Air Products and Chemicals: the business was sold and the factory moved from Chesterfield to Sheffield.

References

External links
History of the TI Group, from the company's former website on the Internet Archive
TI Group former website on the Internet Archive
Smiths Group History

Defunct companies of the United Kingdom
Engineering companies of the United Kingdom
Cycle manufacturers of the United Kingdom
Holding companies established in 1919
Companies based in Oxfordshire
Companies formerly listed on the London Stock Exchange
Steel companies of the United Kingdom
Technology companies established in 1919
1919 establishments in England
Technology companies disestablished in 2000
2000 disestablishments in England
Holding companies disestablished in 2000